Mickaël Brunet (September 6, 1974 – July 31, 2004) was a footballer. He played as a midfielder and played 10 Ligue 2 matches for Niort.

External links
Mickaël Brunet profile at chamoisfc79.fr

1974 births
2004 deaths
French footballers
Association football midfielders
Chamois Niortais F.C. players
Ligue 2 players